The 2019 ICC World Cricket League Division Two was an international cricket tournament that took place in April 2019 in Namibia. It was contested between six teams; Canada, Hong Kong, Oman, Papua New Guinea, the United States and tournament hosts Namibia. It formed part of the 2017–19 cycle of the World Cricket League (WCL) which determined the qualification for the 2023 Cricket World Cup. The final and third-place playoff match were granted One Day International (ODI) status by the International Cricket Council. Namibia won the tournament, after they beat Oman by 145 runs in the final. It was Namibia's first win in an ODI match, and it was the first ever ODI match played by Oman.

Summary
Hong Kong and Papua New Guinea finished in the bottom two places in the 2018 Cricket World Cup Qualifier, therefore relegating them to the Division Two tournament and losing their ODI status in the process. They were joined by Canada and Namibia, who finished third and fourth respectively in the 2018 ICC World Cricket League Division Two tournament, and Oman and the United States, who won promotion from the 2018 ICC World Cricket League Division Three tournament.

Ahead of the tournament in October 2018, it was announced that, following the conclusion of the tournament, the World Cricket League would be replaced by the ICC Cricket World Cup League 2 and the ICC Cricket World Cup Challenge League. The top four teams would join Scotland, Nepal and the United Arab Emirates in League 2 and gain ODI status. The bottom two teams would be assigned to the Challenge League along with other teams from the World Cricket League.

The United States were the first team to qualify for League 2, after they beat Hong Kong by 84 runs in the fourth round of matches. Oman also qualified in the same round of fixtures, after they beat tournament hosts Namibia by four wickets. In the final round of matches, Namibia and Papua New Guinea secured League 2 qualification with big wins. Canada won their final match, against the United States, but finished narrowly behind Papua New Guinea on net run rate and qualified for the Challenge League, along with Hong Kong.

Following the round-robin matches, Canada played Hong Kong in the fifth-place playoff, the United States played Papua New Guinea in the third-place playoff, and hosts Namibia faced Oman in the tournament's final. Claire Polosak was appointed as one of the on-field umpires for the final, becoming the first woman to stand in a men's ODI match.

Teams
Six teams qualified for the tournament:

  (9th in the 2018 Cricket World Cup Qualifier)
  (10th in the 2018 Cricket World Cup Qualifier)
  (3rd in 2018 ICC World Cricket League Division Two)
  (4th in 2018 ICC World Cricket League Division Two)
  (1st in 2018 ICC World Cricket League Division Three)
  (2nd in 2018 ICC World Cricket League Division Three)

Preparation
The United States took part in a one-week tour to Antigua, playing five matches, starting on 10 February 2019. USA Cricket also looked at arranging warm-up fixtures against Australia and Pakistan, followed by two Twenty20 International (T20I) matches against the United Arab Emirates, and some 50 over matches in the UAE during March 2019. Oman hosted a Twenty20 International (T20I) quadrangular series followed by three List A games against Scotland in February 2019, before taking part in an eight-team T20 tournament in Kenya during March 2019. Canada played practice matches in Sri Lanka and South Africa before naming their final squad.

Papua New Guinea and Hong Kong were both aiming to regain ODI status after losing it at the conclusion of the 2018 Cricket World Cup Qualifier. Canada were attempting to regain ODI status that they had lost in 2014, and had recruited the experienced Monty Desai to help guide them back to the top tier of Associate cricket. Hosts Namibia had been regulars in the top divisions of the World Cricket League, but their only previous ODIs were back in 2003, and they had faced a lack of international cricket in the months prior to the tournament in relation to their opponents. The United States were competing in Division Two for the first time, and were a team on the rise following a change in administration. Oman's form had fluctuated since qualifying for the 2016 World T20, the low point coming when they were bowled out for just 24 runs in a List A game against Scotland in February 2019.

Squads

Points table

Fixtures
The following fixtures were confirmed in January 2019.

Round-robin

Playoffs
The final and third-place playoff matches were given ODI status by the ICC, with the fifth-place playoff being a List A match. Oman played in their first ever ODI match. The United States played their first ODI match in fifteen years, after playing two matches in the 2004 ICC Champions Trophy in September 2004.

Fifth-place playoff

Third-place playoff

Final

Final standings

References

External links
 Series home at ESPN Cricinfo

2017–19 ICC World Cricket League
International cricket competitions in 2018–19
2019 in Namibian sport
International cricket competitions in Namibia
World Cricket League Division Two